The 1960 European Nations' Cup quarter-finals was the third round of the qualifying competition for the 1960 European Nations' Cup. It was contested by the eight winners from the round of 16. The winners of each of four home-and-away ties entered the final tournament. The matches were played in 1959 and 1960.

Qualification

Each tie winner progressed to the quarter-finals. The quarter-finals were played in two legs on a home-and-away basis. The winners of the quarter-finals would go through to the final tournament.

Summary

|}

Matches
The eight matches took place over two legs, taking place in 1959 and 1960. All times are CET (UTC+1).

France won 9–4 on aggregate and qualified for the 1960 European Nations' Cup.

Yugoslavia won 6–3 on aggregate and qualified for the 1960 European Nations' Cup.

Czechoslovakia won 5–0 on aggregate and qualified for the 1960 European Nations' Cup.

The Soviet Union qualified for the 1960 European Nations' Cup as Spain refused to travel to the Soviet Union for the first leg: UEFA disqualified Spain, and awarded the Soviet Union a 3–0 victory for both legs.

Goalscorers

Notes

References

External links
Matches at UEFA.com

Second round
1959–60 in French football
1959–60 in Austrian football
1959–60 in Portuguese football
1959–60 in Yugoslav football
1959–60 in Romanian football
1959–60 in Czechoslovak football
1960 in Soviet football
1959–60 in Spanish football
Czechoslovakia at the 1960 European Nations' Cup
France at the 1960 European Nations' Cup
Soviet Union at the 1960 European Nations' Cup
Yugoslavia at the 1960 European Nations' Cup